"Changed the Way You Kiss Me" is a song by British singer Example from his third studio album, Playing in the Shadows. It was released on 5 June 2011 as the album's lead single, after it had premiered on BBC Radio 1 as Zane Lowe's 'Hottest Record in the World' on 24 March 2011. The song was written by Example with Michael Woods, who also produced it. An official remix featuring American rapper Ludacris was made available to mainstream radio in the United States on 1 May 2012.

The song debuted at number-one on the UK Singles Chart, selling over 115,000 copies. With 582,000 copies sold in 2011 alone, the track finished as the year's seventeenth biggest seller and in January 2012 was nominated at the 2012 BRIT Awards. In 2017, the background music was being used for McDonald's advertising.

Music video
A music video to accompany the release of the single, "Changed the Way You Kiss Me", was first released on YouTube on 21 April 2011. The video lasts 3 minutes and 15 seconds long. The video contains real fans from the street and was filmed in the Ministry of Sound club in London.

Critical reception
Lewis Corner of Digital Spy gave the song a positive review stating:

In a chart climate dominated with emotional balladry from Adele one minute and thumping feel-good club-pop from LMFAO the song runs through trance beats with eurodance elements the next, an artist can be forgiven for feeling a little confused about where the current music scene is headed and thus how to create a bona-fide hit that will send them straight to the top. That said, Fulham-born Example may just have the answer with this trailer from his forthcoming LP. .

Track listings

Charts and certifications

Chart performance
"Changed the Way You Kiss Me" saw great success in the United Kingdom, where it debuted at number-one for the week ending 18 June 2011 – the first of Example's releases to achieve this feat – and remained at the top for two weeks. The single made its chart debut in Ireland on 9 June 2011, when it entered at number 6. On its second week on the chart, the single climbed a single place to number 5. On its fifth week, it reached number 3; marking Example's highest-charting single in the country. With sales of 115,046, the single also topped the dance chart and independent chart. The song also charted in Australia, Austria, Belgium, Denmark, Germany, France, Finland, Ireland, New Zealand, Slovakia, Switzerland and Poland. This marks Example's most successful single to date. The song has sold 582,000 copies in 2011.

Weekly charts

Year-end charts

Certifications

Release history

References 

Songs about kissing
2011 singles
Example (musician) songs
Eurodance songs
Trance songs
Number-one singles in Scotland
UK Singles Chart number-one singles
Ministry of Sound singles
Black-and-white music videos
2010 songs
Torch songs
Songs written by Example (musician)
Music videos directed by Adam Powell